Victoria Woodward is a British theatre, radio and television actress and voice coach. She has appeared in Vital Signs, and in EastEnders as Nina Brown.

Theatre
 Helena in A Midsummer Night's Dream and Luciana in Two Gentlemen of Verona at Regent's Park Open Air Theatre
 Playing for Time at Salisbury Playhouse
 Julia in The Rivals for Compass Theatre Company
 Titania in A Midsummer Night's Dream for the Oxford Stage Company
 The Humorous Lieutenant at Battersea Arts Centre
 The Jungle Book at Warwick Arts Centre
 Lydia Languish in The Rivals at Basingstoke Haymarket Theatre
 Soho - A Tale of Tabledancers at the Arcola Theatre

Filmography
The German Lullaby (short) 2007
EastEnders (TV series) 2006
Vital Signs (TV series) 2006

References

External links

British soap opera actresses
Living people
Year of birth missing (living people)
Place of birth missing (living people)